Pasadena Waldorf School is a co-educational Waldorf school in Altadena established in 1979 and whose educational system is based on the methods of Rudolf Steiner.

Overview 
The Pasadena Waldorf School was started as a K-8 school in 1979, and has since expanded to offer Preschool through 12th Grade.. 

The school is situated on two campuses spanning 9 acres in Altadena, California. The Paquita Lick Machris Campus offering grades K-8 is located at 209 E. Mariposa St, and the McComb Campus offering early childhood, preschool and high school is located at 536 E. Mendocino St, just 3 blocks away..

Their religious affiliation is nonsectarian.

Waldorf Education fosters connections between students, teachers, classmates, and the world around us. Discovering how we are connected cultivates a deep sense of respect, social responsibility, and a strong moral compass. Pasadena Waldorf School's mission is to ensure that graduates emerge from school ready to engage in the global community through meaningful relationships and purposeful work.

Academics and Faculty 
The student to teacher ratio is 9:1 (national average is 13:1) with 25% of faculty with advanced degrees.

Support Programmes 
They provide organizational support for high school students with IEP or 504 plan.

Student Body 
There are 300 students, and class sizes typically range from 18-25.

Financial Aid 
They provide an average financial aid of $10000 and has 28% accepting the same.

Sports 
They offer four sports (Basketball, Flag Football, Track and Field, Volleyball) and 16 extracurriculars. In 2017 they formed a shared high school athletics team with Judson International School with the approval of California Interscholastic Federation Southern Section (CIF).

References 

1979 establishments in California
Waldorf schools in the United States